Paul Lynch (born 18 December 1967) is an Australian sprint canoeist who competed in the mid-1990s. He finished ninth in the K-4 1000 m event at the 1996 Summer Olympics in Atlanta.

References
Sports-Reference.com profile

1967 births
Australian male canoeists
Canoeists at the 1996 Summer Olympics
Living people
Olympic canoeists of Australia